The men's 4 × 100 meters relay was a track and field athletics event held as part of the Athletics at the 1912 Summer Olympics program.  It was the debut of the event, which along with the 4 × 400-meter relays marked the first relays of equal legs in the athletics program (a medley relay had been held in 1908). The competition was held on Monday, July 8, 1912, and on Tuesday, July 9, 1912. NOCs could enter 1 team of 4 athletes, with up to 2 reserves.

Thirty-three runners from 8 nations competed. Only Germany replaced one runner.

Records

The record for the new event progressed quickly, with the Canadians winning the first heat. The Americans and then the Swedes then took the record, with the Germans tying the Swedes.

The British took the record in the first semifinal, only to lose it quickly to the Swedes in the second. This time, the Germans running in the third semifinal bested the Swedish team's time to take the record for themselves after replacing Karl Halt with Otto Röhr as their lead-off runner.

The German team held the record at the finish, despite finishing in second (and then being disqualified for a baton-passing fault) in the final.  Their disqualification left the event without a bronze medalist, making it the only athletics event to award only two medals.

The record of the German team, 42.3 seconds, became the first official world record for the 4 × 100 meters relay.

Results

Heats

All heats were held on Monday, July 8, 1912.

Only two teams were eliminated after the first round.

Heat 1

Heat 2

Heat 3

Heat 4

Heat 5

Heat 6

Semifinals

All semifinals were held on Monday, July 8, 1912.

Semifinal 1

The United States team was disqualified after a baton-passing fault on the first transfer.

Semifinal 2

Semifinal 3

Final

The final was held on Tuesday, July 9, 1912: d'Arcy beat Rau and Lindberg in a close and exciting contest. 

Afterwards, the German team were disqualified as Kern had passed the 20 metre line before receiving the baton from Herrmann. This left no bronze medalist in the event.

Gallery

References

Sources
 
 

Men's hurdles 110 metres
Relay foot races at the Olympics
4 × 100 metres relay